Vire is a town and a former commune in the Calvados department in the Normandy region in northwestern France. On 1 January 2016, it was merged into the new commune of Vire Normandie.

Geography
The town is located on the river Vire. Much of its surroundings consist of the bocage virois, a type of mixed woodland and pasture common in Normandy.

History 
In 1123, King of England and Duke of Normandy Henry I had a redoubt constructed on a rocky hill top, which was surrounded by the Vire river. The redoubt was stoned square at the bottom to assure the defense of the Duchy of Normandy against any attacks from Brittany or Maine.
 
At the beginning of the 13th century, King Louis IX of France ordered that the existing stonework be supplemented with exterior ramparts. However the second precinct was finished only in the early the 14th century.

At the end of the Middle Ages, the village prospered first with leather and then with textiles During the Hundred Years' War, Vire was plundered in 1368 by large military companies, and delivered to the English in 1418. The English occupation would end in 1450, with many considering it a time of brutality and oppression. Notably, the execution of Hugues Vaux, owner of the largest farm of the village, after refusing to give up his farm to the English sergeant Fields, caused much grief among the population.  Some inhabitants nevertheless benefited from the English occupation. Eugène Vergny, who provided Fields with information about the movement of the French troops, received the property of Vaux after his execution.

During the reign of Louis XIII of France, because a number of Fortifications of the Middle Ages served in rebellions by the Huguenots in particular, the castle and its precinct were dismantled on orders of Richelieu.

During the 19th century, the village did not respond well to the Industrial Revolution and went into an important recession.

The castle of Tracy, the manor of 19th-century the French historian Arcisse de Caumont, can be found just north of Vire in the old community of Neuville.

Like many other Norman cities and villages, Vire suffered heavily from British bombings on June 6, 1944, or D-Day, during the Second World War. 95% of the town was destroyed. One of the two target marking flare groups was out of alignment and much of the bombing fell across the town of Vire. The Master Bomber in charge of the operation identified the problem and issued corrections to the incoming aircraft.  Much of the bombing from the first wave of aircraft fell across the town of Vire killing many of the inhabitants. It was a distressing night for many families.

The reconstruction of began in the 1960s.

Population

Administration
In 1953, Vire was merged with the former commune of Neuville. In 1972, Vire was merged with the former commune of Saint-Martin-de-Tallevende. Since January 2016, it is a delegated commune within the commune Vire Normandie. Vire is part of the canton of Vire Normandie.

Transport 
Vire has a large railway station (Gare de Vire) which has frequent services to Paris and Granville. The nearest airport is Caen – Carpiquet Airport in Caen (40 min drive).

Vire is connected to Saint-Lô and Cherbourg-en-Cotentin via RN 174 and to Caen via RD 577 and A84. Vire is also connected to Granville, Villedieu-les-Poêles, Flers, Argentan, Dreux and Paris via RD 924.

Gastronomy
Andouille, a speciality of Vire.

International relations

Vire is twinned with:

Personalities
 Charles-Julien Lioult de Chênedollé
 Henry I of England
Francis Letellier
 Olivier Basselin
 Thomas Pichon
 Raymond Lefebvre

See also
Communes of the Calvados department

References

External links

Former communes of Calvados (department)